The Yowani were a historical group of Choctaw people who lived in Texas.
Yowani was also the name of a preremoval Choctaw village.

When this area became part of the United States under the Louisiana Purchase in 1803, many of the resident Indian tribes wanted to emigrate to less hostile environs. Spain agreed to allow the Yowani and the Alabama-Coushatta to move to Spanish Texas. In 1824, after Mexico gained independence, a second group of Yowani received permission to establish villages in Texas. The Yowani gradually abandoned their original Mississippi homelands. By 1850 most Yowani had moved west and lived within the Chickasaw Nation in Indian Territory near present-day Ardmore and Marlow, Oklahoma, and in Rusk and Smith counties in east Texas, as a part of the Mount Tabor Indian Community.

During the Texas Revolution in 1836, the Yowani were a party to a peace treaty with the new provisional government of Texas. Following Texas's independence and the creation of the Republic of Texas, relations between Indian tribes and English-speaking settlers deteriorated. Under President Mirabeau B. Lamar, the Texas Army drove most of the Cherokee out of Texas. A vigilante group attacked the Choctaw instead. The survivors split up, with most leaving Texas.

Between 1840 and 1843, elements of the Mexican militia, led by Vicente Cordova, fought a guerrilla war against the Anglo settlers, using warriors from remnant groups of displaced tribes, primarily Cherokee but including some Yowani Choctaw. General Adrian Woll led the Mexican occupation of San Antonio in September 1842. Both Indian and Mexican regulars were involved in the defeat of the Dawson Expedition and the Battle of Salado Creek. The Mexican troops soon departed from Texas.

For the remnant tribes, peace came when Sam Houston was elected as President of Texas the next year. He approved the Treaty of Birds Fort, which brought an end to hostilities, especially for the Cherokee residing at Monclova, Mexico under Chicken Trotter. Following the end of the Texas-Indian Wars, some of the Yowani returned to East Texas, where they settled with members of Chicken Trotter's Texas Cherokee, along with Old Settler and Ridge Party Cherokee, and McIntosh Party Creek. These three groups combined to form the Mount Tabor Indian Community.

Most of the men served in the Confederate Army during the American Civil War. In the early 20th century, several members of the Yowani Choctaw, led by William Clyde Thompson of Texas, relocated to the Chickasaw Nation in Indian Territory. They wanted to be included in registration for the Dawes Commission Final Rolls as citizens by blood of the Choctaw Nation and recognized by the federal government. This would enable them to be eligible for allotments of land, as the United States had decided to allocate the tribal communal land to individual households to encourage their adoption of subsistence farming. A long political struggle ensued between 1898 and 1909, as the Choctaw leaders of Indian Territory did not want the long-absent Yowani to receive any of their land.

In 1905 the Bureau of Indian Affairs struck all the registered Texas Yowani from the Final Rolls of the Choctaw Nation. Thompson pursued a legal challenge, appealing the government's action ultimately to the United States Supreme Court. It ruled in favor of the Yowani, and these families were included on a 1909 Choctaw reinstatement list, giving them citizenship in the Choctaw Nation and the right to any associated benefits.

Village 
The original Yowani village appeared on a 1777 French map near the village of Chiasawhay and the Pascagoula River, west of what was described at the "Choctaw Capitale."

The Yowani Choctaw were associated by name with the village where they were living when French traders from the La Louisiane colony encountered them. The word in Choctaw is believed to have meant "caterpillar," likely common at that site.

Over time, the Yowani band expanded its territory westward to the eastern dividing ridge of Bogue Homa, then northward as far as present-day Pachuta Creek. From this point, their territory ran south to the confluence of the Chickasawhay and Buckatunna rivers.

By 1764, a group of Yowani had moved west into Louisiana, where they established contact with the Koasati and Caddo indigenous peoples. Over time, the Yowani adopted Caddo customs and the groups became very interlinked by marriage.

In the late 19th century, the American anthropologist James Mooney listed the Yowani as one of the 13 divisions of the Caddo Confederacy.

Moving westward
At the time that the Yowani ventured into Louisiana, the territory had been under Spanish control since 1763, when France ceded it after defeat by Great Britain in the Seven Years' War, fought both in Europe and North America. In 1800, Spain traded Louisiana back to France. After Napoleon briefly attempted to re-establish control over Saint-Domingue, with visions of empire in North America, he sold the mainland territory in 1803 to the United States as what they called the Louisiana Purchase. It doubled the area of the new nation. Many of the ethnic French residents of Louisiana, and many of the Indian tribes, did not want to be ruled by the United States.

Spain agreed to allow several Indian tribes, including the Yowani Choctaw and the Alabama-Coushatta, to relocate to the neighboring Spanish colonial province of Texas. Other Indian tribes later emigrated to Texas to avoid the Americans; these included some Cherokee, Muscogee-Creek, Seminole, Shawnee, Delaware, Quapaw, Kickapoo and Miami Indians. Following the Mexican War of Independence from Spain, Mexico assumed control of Texas. In 1824, another group of Yowani, led by Atahobia, petitioned the Mexican government to settle within the province of Texas. They were given permission to establish several villages east of the Trinity River and west of the border with Louisiana.

During the period between 1810 and 1836, many of the relocated tribes, including the Yowani Choctaw, were often subject to attacks from the Comanche who roamed the western part of Texas. The Lipan Apache, located in the southern part of the province, also attacked them. The Yowani often joined forces with the English-speaking settlers for self-defense against these nomadic tribes.

By 1832, all but two families had left the traditional Yowani lands in Mississippi to migrate west. Although some settled briefly in what is now Rapides Parish, Louisiana, by 1850 many of the Yowani had settled with other Choctaw in the Chickasaw Nation in Indian Territory. This area had been established during Indian Removal of the 1830s, when the US forced tribes from the East to west of the Mississippi River, exchanging lands and arranging payments or annuities in some instances.

The Yowani remaining in east Texas joined with other remnant peoples to form a part of what is now recognized as the Mount Tabor Indian Community. In Louisiana, they were closely related to the remaining Coushatta, the Louisiana Band of Choctaw and the Jena Band of Choctaw.

Texas Indian Wars 1835–1843

In 1835, English-speaking settlers and some anti-Santa Anna Tejanos in Texas launched the Texas Revolution to gain independence from Mexico. The provisional Texas government sent Sam Houston, a man much respected by the Cherokee, to negotiate a treaty with the Indians living in East Texas. They concluded a treaty at Bowles Village on February 23, 1836, between the Cherokee and Twelve Associated Tribes and the provisional Texas government. This treaty was the first in an attempt to form an inter-tribal community in which the Choctaw were fully involved.

In March 1836, the Republic of Texas was established, gaining full independence from Mexico the following month. Elected the first president of the Republic, Houston continued to negotiate peace with the various Indian tribes. After 1837, the Yowani combined settlements to form a single village on Attoyac Bayou in extreme southeastern Rusk County. An 1837 census of Indians in the Republic of Texas noted that 70 Yowani Choctaw lived in this village, along with several Chickasaw. The census also noted that these people were peaceable.

The Texas Legislature refused to ratify many of Houston's treaties. The second president of the Republic, Mirabeau Lamar, did not share Houston's respect for the native tribes, and refused to honor Houston's treaties. New settlers to the region often settled or encroached on lands that had been granted to Indian tribes, and some tribes retaliated against them. In the summer of 1839, Lamar ordered the Texian Army to attack Cherokee villages. The Americans eventually drove the Cherokee out of Texas; some went to Indian Territory, where the Cherokee Nation had relocated, and others to northern Mexico.

Several small Cherokee bands escaped detection and removal. One small band, led by Chicken Trotter, tried to regain some of their lands in 1840. While his petition was pending in the Republic legislature, Chicken Trotter and several other Cherokee were involved in an altercation with three white men near Nacogdoches. The resulting scuffle resulted in the deaths of the three whites. Fearing hostility of other whites, Chicken Trotter led his group to Monclova, Coahuila, Mexico.

Angry at the death of the three white men, a vigilante group formed in Nacogdoches. Unable to catch up to Chicken Trotter and his group, the vigilantes attacked the nearby Yowani village, massacring some eleven Choctaw men, women, and children. After the attack, the Yowani Choctaw abandoned their village. Some returned to Mississippi and others moved to Indian Territory to join the Chickasaw Nation. A third group joined the Caddo at the Brazos Reservation further west, and eventually accompanied the Caddo to a reservation in Indian Territory. A fourth group, led by Woody Jones, chose to remain in East Texas, moving further into the piney woods to avoid detection by Texas military forces.

Throughout Lamar's term as president, the Republic of Texas conducted a policy of attrition against various groups of Natives, including those under Chicken Trotter. He launched a guerrilla campaign against Texans. When Lamar's term expired, Sam Houston was elected to a second term as president. Houston began treaty negotiations with the tribes, culminating in the Treaty of Birds Fort, which was concluded on September 29, 1843. This treaty ended most hostilities in Texas with the tribes who had migrated to Texas decades before. Although the Yowani were not a direct party to it, they had several ties to those in attendance. Many of the displaced tribes, including some Yowani Choctaw, formed a new community, Mount Tabor Indian Community. Many Yowani continued to live under the authority of Woody Jones in Houston County near the border with Trinity County.

Mount Tabor Indian Community
The Mount Tabor Indian Community formed following the purchase of 10,000 acres of land in Rusk County by Benjamin Franklin Thompson in the spring of 1844. Acting on behalf of the Cherokee, Thompson was the American husband of Annie Martin, a Cherokee and daughter of John Martin, first Chief Justice of the Cherokee Nation. These Cherokee were joined by those who had been a part of the original Texas Cherokee Nation and removed to Monclova, Coahuila, Mexico. The Mount Tabor community continued to grow after Texas joined the United States in 1845.

President James K. Polk in 1844 granted permission to both members of the Ridge Party and the Old Settlers of the Cherokee, who had political differences with the Cherokee Nation, to relocate from Indian Territory to Mount Tabor. The community was named by John Adair Bell, a Cherokee signer of the Treaty of New Echota. More Yowani Choctaw, led by Atahobia's grandson Archibald Thompson and Nashoba's grandson Jeremiah Jones, relocated to the Mount Tabor Indian Community before 1850. These were followed by McIntosh Creek Indians, led by brothers William and Thomas Berryhill, also before 1850.

Civil War

When the American Civil War erupted, almost all of the people living at Mount Tabor supported the Confederacy. It had promised the Native American tribes a state of their own if the Confederacy won the war. Many enlisted in the Confederate Army as part of the Cherokee Mounted Rifles under Stand Watie, who was commissioned as a high-ranking officer. During the war, two other Cherokee communities formed in Texas. These were mainly for the protection of Confederate soldiers' families. Besides Rusk County, another Cherokee community formed near present-day Waco, as well as one in Wood County near Quitman. The Wood County group consisted of both Cherokee and Choctaw. While a few of the Mount Tabor Yowani enlisted with the Cherokee Mounted Rifles, most became part of the Texas 14th Cavalry under John Martin Thompson. The war took a heavy toll on the community, as nearly one-quarter of all male residents were dead by the end of the war.

Dawes Commission

Between 1866 and the close of the Dawes Commission Final Rolls in the early 20th century, 80% of the Cherokee left Mount Tabor to return north to the Cherokee Nation. Most of the Texas Choctaw stayed in Texas, with a few relocating to the Chickasaw Nation. Only during the period of registration in the Dawes Rolls under the Commission, when members registered to be eligible for allotments of communal land, did a number of Choctaw take the opportunities available and move north.

A handful settled in Atoka in the Choctaw Nation. One family moved to Tuskahoma. The majority moved into Pickens County in the Chickasaw Nation near present-day Marlow, Oklahoma.

Many of the Yowani Choctaw from Texas sought to register on the Final Rolls of the Five Civilized Tribes as Citizens by Blood in the Choctaw Nation. Because of their long residence in Texas, the Choctaw Nation officially opposed them and challenged theirs and other registrations. In 1906, 70 members of the Yowani Choctaw who lived in Texas were stricken from the membership rolls of the Choctaw Nation. William C. Thompson and his cousin John Thurston Thompson, Jr. were among them, and sued to be reinstated. In 1909, the United States Supreme Court ruled in their favor, saying that the Texas Choctaw should be reinstated.

Recent years
Throughout the twentieth century, there have been a number strong leaders among the Texas Choctaw community within the overall Mount Tabor Indian Community, which has been recognized as a tribe by the state. These include William Clyde Thompson and Martin Luther Thompson, who helped gain registration for their peoples as citizens "by Blood" in the Choctaw Nation. They also helped to keep the Texas community viable. The Cherokee predominated by number in the group and generally led the community.

No Choctaw was selected as Chairman of the Executive Committee before 1988. When the Cherokee Nation adopted its 1975 constitution, it excluded the Texas Cherokees and Associate Bands-Mount Tabor Indian Community as a band or affiliate of the Cherokee Nation of Oklahoma, although they had been considered so during the earlier part of the 20th century. Cherokee who remained in Texas were no longer recognized formally as part of a tribe or as Native Americans by the Federal Government. In 1972 Judge Foster T. Bean, an original enrollee on the Guion Miller Roll, took over as Chairman of the Texas Cherokees and Associate Bands. Keeler became Principal Chief of the Cherokee Nation.

Judge Bean served until retiring from in 1988. He was replaced by J.C. Thompson, who as a descendant of the Thompson-McCoy family was of Cherokee, Choctaw and Chickasaw descent. Thompson held the position for eleven years until Terry Easterly took over in 1999.

Terry was descended from Arthur Thompson, brother of William Clyde Thompson. Terry was the first woman to hold the position and the first who did not have Cherokee blood. Terry was Choctaw, Chickasaw and Muscogee-Creek, and was the first person of Creek ancestry to head the community. In 2001, she was succeeded by Peggy Dean-Atwood, Choctaw and Chickasaw, a descendant of Archibald Thompson. In 2002, J.C. Thompson was then again chosen as Chairman and remained in that capacity until August 2018. He was succeeded by William Ellis "Billy" Bean. Chairman Bean is the great grandson of Mount Tabor Chief John Ellis Bean, an original enrollee on the Cherokee Old Settler payment roll. Chairman Bean was removed as Tribal Chairman by action of the Tribal Court for cause on September 2, 2019. He was replaced by Cheryl Giordano of Arp, who is of Choctaw-Chickasaw descent and had previously served as Operations Coordinator on the Executive Committee. She is assisted today by Deputy Chairman Rex Thompson, Choctaw, Chickasaw, Cherokee of Troup. The next tribal election is tentatively scheduled for October 2020.

The Community is continuing to seek Federal Acknowledgment as an American Indian Tribe. On May 10, 2017, Texas Governor Greg Abbot signed into law 84 SCR 25, recognizing the Mount Tabor Indian Community in Texas. The community adopted a new constitution in August 2017,  establishing a three-tier government made up of the five-member Executive Committee; a seven-member Tribal Council, and a three-member Tribal Court. There are more than 500 enrolled members, with offices in both Kilgore and Troup, Texas. The Community also supports the Mount Tabor Indian Heritage Center

See also
 Charles Collins Thompson
 John Martin Thompson
 Martin Luther Thompson
 Mount Tabor Indian Community
 Stand Watie
 William Clyde Thompson

References

Notes

Bibliography

Sources
  The Choctaw Before Removal By Carolyn Keller Reeves, Published by University Press of Mississippi, 2004, 
  Texas A&M University-Sons of Dewitt Colony Texas: Texas—Disputed Border and Buffer between New Spain and the United States, Neutral Ground (No Man's Land) between the Sabine and Arroyo Hondo—Attempts to Control Immigration 1805-1809
  Texas A&M University-The Journal of Lieutenant Colonel Don Manuel Salcedo, March 11, 1810 - June 23, 1810
  Texas A&M University-Tenoxtitlan, Dream Capital of Texas; by Dr. Malcolm D. McLean, Originally published in "The Southwestern Historical Quarterly" July 1966, Vol. LXX, No. 1
  Texas A&M University-Sons of DeWitt Colony Texas: Some difficulties of a Texas Emprsario, Letter from L.R. Kenny to Stephen F. Austin, May 5, 1826
  Texas A&M University-Sons of DeWitt Colony Texas: Letter of Peter Ellis Bean to US President Andrew Jackson September 11, 1835
  Texas Indian Papers 1837, census of tribes in the Republic, attitudes of the Yowani Choctaws and allied Chickasaws of Attoyac Bayou, Nacogdoches District
  Texas by Terán By Manuel de Mier y Teran, Jack Jackson, John Wheat, Scooter Cheatham, Lynn Marshall
  William C. Thompson and the Choctaw-Chickasaw Paper Chase, by Dr. Douglas Hale, Oklahoma State University
  The Old Mount Tabor Community; Genealogy of Old and New Cherokee Indian Families, (out of print) By George Morrison Bell Sr. 1969
  Oklahoma Genealogical Society Quarterly, Volume 9, Number 2, 1964
  Cherokee Adairs, By Betty Barker and the Adair Reunion Committee; A family history recording the Adair family from Europe to the Cheorkee Nation, 2003, ARC Press 
  The Dawes Commission and the Allotment of the Five Civilized Tribes, 1893-1914 By Kent Carter, Published by Ancestry Publishing, 1999, 9780916489854
  The Handbook of Texas Online: Indians; Republics of Mexico and Texas, George Klos
  The Handbook of Texas Online: Yowani Indians, Margery H. Krieger
  Asbury Indian Cemetery, Smith County, Texas, Information related to Choctaw and Cherokee descendants buried there, by Paul Ridenour, 2005
  Handbook of Texas Online: John Martin Thompson, By Thomas D. Isern
  Texas-Cherokees vs United States Docket 26, 26 Ind Cl Comm. 78 (1971)
  Library of the University of Michigan, Department of the Interior, Laws, Decisions and Regulations Affecting the work of the Commissioner to the Five Civilized Tribes 1893-1906 pgs 130-138
  United States Department of the Interior, secretary of the Interior-Choctaw Citizenship Cases, #4 William C. Thompson et al., pgs 151-157
  Texas Legislature Online "Actions" Senate Recognition of the Mount Tabor Indian Community

External links
Legacy of Los Adaes
The Chickasaw Nation of Oklahoma (official site)
A History of the Caddo Indians By: WILLIAM B. GLOVER
The Handbook of Texas Online: Yowani Indians, Margery H. Krieger
The Handbook of Texas Online: Indians by George Klos
The Handbook of Texas Online: Mount Tabor Indian Community by Patrick Pynes
Mt. Tabor Cemetery, Rusk County TxGenWeb
Law Offices of Steven D. Sandven, Texas Choctaw proposed constitution separate from the Texas Cherokees and Associate Bands, 2005

Native American history of Texas
Choctaw